A tricolour or tricolor is a type of flag or banner design with a triband design which originated in the 16th century as a symbol of republicanism, liberty, or revolution.  The flags of France, Italy, Romania, Mexico, and Ireland were all first adopted with the formation of an independent republic in the period of the French Revolution to the Revolutions of 1848, with the exception of the Irish tricolour, which dates from 1848 but was not popularised until the Easter Rising in 1916 and adopted in 1919.

History

The first association of the tricolour with republicanism is the orange-white-blue design of the Prince's Flag (Prinsenvlag, predecessor of the flags of the Netherlands), used from 1579 by William I of Orange-Nassau in the Eighty Years' War, establishing the independence of the Dutch Republic from the Spanish Empire. The flag of the Netherlands inspired both the French and Russian flags, which in turn inspired many further tricolour flags in other countries.

Though not the first tricolour flag, one of the most famous, known as Le Tricolore, is the blue, white and red (whence also called Le Bleu-Blanc-Rouge) flag of France adopted in 1790 during the French Revolution. Based on a 1789 design of the Cockade of France, it was easy to construct and also stood in a visual opposition to complicated royal banners of the Ancien Regime.

With the formation of French client republics after 1795, the revolutionary tricolour was exported and adopted more widely in Europe, by the Republic of Alba 1796 (red-blue-yellow), the Cisalpine Republic 1797 (Transpadane Republic, green-white-red), the Cisrhenian Republic 1797 (green-white-red), the Anconine Republic 1797  (blue-yellow-red), the Roman Republic 1798 (black-white-red), the Helvetic Republic 1798 (green-red-yellow; canton of Neuchatel 1848), the Parthenopean Republic 1799 (blue-yellow-red), and the Principality of Lucca and Piombino 1805 (blue-white-red). Thus providing the format for many of modern Europe's national flags, from the flag of Italy, to the flag of Germany, flag of Ireland, flag of Belgium, flag of Romania, flag of Bulgaria, flag of Moldova, and others around the world such as the flag of India, flag of Cameroon, flag of Chad, flag of Ivory Coast, flag of Gabon, flag of Guinea, flag of Mali, and flag of Nigeria.

The green-white-red tricolour remained a symbol of republicanism throughout the 19th century and was adopted as national flag by a number of states following the Revolutions of 1848. It was also adopted by the Kingdom of Sardinia (inherited by the Kingdom of Italy 1861).

The flag of Germany (black-red-gold) originates from the uniform colors of the Lützow Free Corps during the Napoleonic Wars, which contained volunteers from many German states and became famous through propaganda. Prominent veterans and later students became the core of the republican movement of early 1800s which adopted the colors. At the time the flag was known as Dreifarb, a German calque of Tricolore. It was a symbol of opposition against the German Kleinstaaterei and the desire for German Unification. It was at first illegal in the German Confederation, but was adopted as the national flag at the Frankfurt Parliament of 1848/9. The flag of Belgium was introduced in a similar context, in 1831, its colors taken from the flag used in the Brabant Revolution of 1789.
The first national flag of the New World inspired by this symbolism was the flag of Mexico, adopted when the First Mexican Empire gained independence from Spain in 1821.

After 1848, the young republican nation states continued to pick triband designs, but now more prevalently expressing the sentiment of nationalism or ethnic identity than anti-monarchism, the flag of Hungary (1848), the flag of Romania (1848), the Flag of Ireland (1848),
the flag of Estonia (1880s),
the flag of Lithuania (1905),
and the flag of Armenia (1918). 
By contrast, the flag of Russia was adopted by the Tsardom of Russia in the late 17th century and while it may or may not have been inspired by the Dutch tricolour, it never had any republican implications.

The political ideology of the unification of an ethnic nation state associated with tricolour flags since the 19th century has resulted in the design of new "tricolours" expressing specific nationalisms in the 20th century, 
the Pan-African colours adopted in the 1920s for Pan-Africanism, chosen in numerous African flags during decolonisation (green-yellow-red, taken from the triband design used by the Solomonic dynasty for the Ethiopian Empire since 1897). The Pan-Arab colors adopted in Arab nationalism 1916 are a comparable concept, even though they combine four, not three, colours.
Also in the 20th century, Pan-Iranian colours for Iranian nationalism and Pan-Slavic colors for Slavic nationalism were adopted based on the triband design of the flags used during the 19th century by the Qajar dynasty and the Russian Empire, respectively.

The Indian independence movement in 1931 also adopted a tricolour (loan-translated as Hindi, तिरंगा Tiraṅgā) in the traditional symbolism of "national unification" and republican "self-rule" (Purna Swaraj), adopted as the flag of the Indian Republic in 1947.

In 1999, a red, green, and blue tricolour was proposed as the Flag of Mars. The design symbolises liberty, and also the terraforming of Mars by humanity from a red planet to a green one, and eventually an Earth-like blue one.

Gallery

See also
List of national flags by design 
Fin flash on military aircraft, sometimes in a "tricolour" form 
Triband (flag)

References

Color schemes
Types of flags
French Revolution
History of liberalism
National symbols
Political flags
Republicanism
Revolution
Flags by design